Justice Thornton or Judge Thornton or variation, may refer to:

Anthony Thornton (politician) (1814–1904), associate justice of the Illinois Supreme Court
James D. Thornton (1823–1902), associate justice of the Supreme Court of California
Ray Thornton (1928–2016), associate justice of the Arkansas Supreme Court
T. Eugene Thornton (1911–1967), associate justice of the Iowa Supreme Court

See also
 Thornton (surname)
 Judge Thornton (disambiguation)
 Thornton (disambiguation)